Sweet Diss and the Comebacks is a power pop band from Washington state. The band's sound is a mix of punk–influenced power pop with copious vocal harmonies and heavy guitar riffs. They are well known for the songs "Pam Pong" and "Dunder and Dwightning," both loving odes to The Office. "Pam Pong" was featured in the documentary Fandomicity about the television series The Office and in the magazine Entertainment Weekly. The band released their latest album Emerald City Love Song on March 1, 2012.

Notes

External links 
 Official Website
 OfficeTally's page dedicated to the band
 Interview with This Is Pop Music
 Interview with The Two Cents
 Music Video for the song "Pam Pong"

Rock music groups from Washington (state)
American power pop groups